Mark Allen Small (November 12, 1967 - October 22, 2013) was an American professional baseball pitcher. In 16 career games, he had a 0-1 record with a 5.92 ERA. He batted and threw right-handed.

Small attended Washington State University, where he played college baseball for the Cougars from 1988–1989.  He was drafted by the Astros in the 17th round of the 1989 amateur draft.

Small was surrounded by family and friends when he died at 9:30 pm in Edmonds, Washington on October 22, 2013. A cause of death was not reported.

References

External links
, or Retrosheet
Pelota Binaria

1967 births
2013 deaths
American expatriate baseball players in Canada
Asheville Tourists players
Auburn Astros players
Baseball players from Portland, Oregon
Houston Astros players
Jackson Generals (Texas League) players
Major League Baseball pitchers
Navegantes del Magallanes players
American expatriate baseball players in Venezuela
New Orleans Zephyrs players
Oklahoma RedHawks players
Osceola Astros players
Ottawa Lynx players
People from Edmonds, Washington
Tucson Toros players
Washington State Cougars baseball players